Little Pine can refer to:
California
Little Pine, California, former name of Independence, California
Minnesota
Little Pine Township, Minnesota
Pennsylvania
Little Pine Creek 
Little Pine State Park

Companies
 Little Pine (restaurant), vegan bistro in Los Angeles, California